Precious Images is a 1986 short film directed by Chuck Workman. It features approximately 470 half-second-long splices of movie moments through the history of American film. Some of the clips are organized by genre and set to appropriate music; musicals, for example, are accompanied by the title song from Singin' in the Rain. Films featured range chronologically from The Great Train Robbery (1903) to Rocky IV (1985), and range in subject from light comedies to dramas and horror films.

Production
Precious Images was commissioned by the Directors Guild for its 50th anniversary. Workman had previously produced two documentaries, The Director and the Image (1984) and The Director and the Actor (1984), for the Guild. Editing took two or three months to complete.

Precious Images features half-second-long splices from approximately 470 American films. Chuck Workman described the film's editing structure as "a sprint. You take a breath and you go."
"Of course, I had so many movies I wanted to include that the time constraint forced me to compress the film more and more. The cutting got faster and faster, but I realized that the film was still working. And I was moving things around, and it was still working. I started finding these wonderful little combinations of shots, the kind of edits that I'd been doing for years in other things, but suddenly in this film I wasn't selling anything. It was a wonderful moment for me."

Release
Precious Images won the Oscar for Live Action Short Film during the 1987 ceremony, where it was featured in its entirety. In 1996, the film was reissued with new scenes from more contemporary films up to that point. It was also shown every 15 minutes within London's Museum of the Moving Image since its 1988 opening, but this very popular attraction was closed in 1999.

The film was screened out of competition at the 1986 Cannes Film Festival.

Recognition
In 2009, Precious Images was selected for preservation in the United States National Film Registry by the Library of Congress as being "culturally, historically, or aesthetically significant".

References

External links
Precious Images essay by Dale Hudson and Patricia R. Zimmermann at National Film Registry

 List of all films featured in Precious Images
Original 1986 version and 1996 reissue (latter officially posted by Workman on Vimeo)
Precious Images essay by Daniel Eagan In America's Film Legacy, 2009-2010: A Viewer's Guide To The 50 Landmark Movies Added To The National Film Registry In 2009-10, Bloomsbury Publishing USA, 2011,  pages 178-179 

1986 films
American independent films
Collage film
1986 short films
Live Action Short Film Academy Award winners
Films directed by Chuck Workman
United States National Film Registry films
Compilation films
1986 independent films
1980s English-language films
1980s American films